Gastilonys is a former village in the Kaišiadorys District Municipality, Lithuania,  located 1 kilometer south of Grabučiškės, on the right bank of the Kaunas Reservoir.

The Gastilonys Botanical-Zoological Reserve has been established in the village, where  grows.

History 
In around 1960, when the construction of the Kaunas Hydroelectric Power Plant started, the village was evicted, because after the construction of the power plant, the whole territory of Kaunas appeared at the bottom of the Kaunas Reservoir.

Origin of the name 
The name of the village comes from the surname Gastila.

References

Villages in Kaunas County
Former populated places in Lithuania